Oswaldo Luizar Obregón (born 13 November 1962) a Peruvian politician. He studied Physics. He is formerly a Congressman representing Cusco for the period 2006–2011, and belongs to the Peruvian Nationalist Party. He ran again in the 2016 elections, this time under the Fujimorist Popular Force, but he was not elected.

Biography 
He is the son of Jesús Orestes Luizar Fernández and María Celia Obregón Sánchez. He completed his primary and secondary studies at the Science College between 1969 and 1978. In 1979 he traveled to Russia where he studied Physics at the Faculty of Sciences of the Peoples Friendship University until 1985. Between 1996 and 2001 he did postgraduate studies in Physics magnetospheric at the University of Santiago de Chile.

References

Living people
Union for Peru politicians
Members of the Congress of the Republic of Peru
1962 births

Fujimorista politicians
Peruvian Nationalist Party politicians